Portuguese-language countries  may refer to:

 Community of Portuguese Language Countries
 Countries where Portuguese is an official language